Skul: The Hero Slayer is a 2021 roguelike-action platformer developed by SouthPAW Games and published by Neowiz. The game was released on January 21, 2021 for Microsoft Windows, macOS, and Linux, and launched on October 21, 2021 for Xbox One, Nintendo Switch, and PlayStation 4. In the game, players control a skeleton named Skul as he attempts to save demonkind from their enemies, the heroes. The player can remove Skul's head for different skulls, granting new combat abilities across randomly-generated levels. The game received positive reviews on release.

Gameplay 
Skul: The Hero Slayer is a 2D side-scrolling action platformer with roguelike elements. The player controls a living skeleton named Skul, who serves as a soldier in the Demon King's army. As Skul, the player must traverse randomly-generated levels to save the denizens of the Demon King's castle who were captured by the heroes. Skul can slash enemies with his sword, dodge attacks, and throw his skull to damage enemies or teleport to where it landed. The player can remove Skul's head and replace it with a skull that he finds, giving him new abilities in combat. Skul can equip up to two heads at a time, and can switch between both during combat.

Levels are procedurally generated, and have a boss at the end of every three stages. At the end of each level, Skul may choose between two doors, which have different contents inside. Levels may contain a new skull, gold, shops, or a sanctuary area where Skul can spend gold in exchange for hit points or helpful items.

Reception 
The game received generally favorable reviews, according to review aggregator Metacritic. Travis Northrup of IGN compared the game to Dead Cells and The Legend of Zelda: Majora's Mask, praising the diversity in playstyles that the skulls offered, while criticizing the game's bosses as repetitive. Alex Orona of Nintendo World Report liked the game's music and fast-paced combat, but considered the story sparse and simplistic. Ben Kuchera of Polygon enjoyed the enemy behavior and combat execution, saying it outweighed a poorly translated story and repetitive music.

References

External links 
Official website

2021 video games
Windows games
MacOS games
Linux games
Indie video games
Nintendo Switch games
PlayStation 4 games
Xbox One games
Roguelike video games
Platform games